The Riet River  is a river in the Western Cape Province, South Africa. It is part of the Olifants/Doring River system.

Course
It originates in the Koue Bokkeveld Mountains north of Ceres at the confluence of the Winkelhaak River and Houdenbeks River, flowing roughly northwards. After the Groot River joins its left bank it turns eastwards. Below this confluence, the Riet River is joined by the Brandkraals River on its right bank and by the Matjies River on its left side, after which it flows into the Doring River at a place known as De Mond.

Ecology
The Clanwilliam Yellowfish (Labeobarbus capensis), a local endemic species classified as Vulnerable by the IUCN, is still found in the Doring and other rivers of its basin.

See also
 List of rivers of South Africa

References

External links
Olifants/Doorn WMA: Internal Strategic Perspective

Rivers of the Western Cape